Skander Souayah (born 20 November 1972) is a Tunisian former football player who played for CS Sfaxien and Espérance Tunis.

He played for the Tunisia national football team and was a participant at the 1998 FIFA World Cup, where he scored the only Tunisian goal of the competition from the penalty kick in the match against Romania.

Souayah received a six-month ban from FIFA's Disciplinary Committee following his positive doping test in March 2002.

International goals

References

External links

1972 births
Living people
Tunisian footballers
1998 FIFA World Cup players
Tunisia international footballers
Al Ain FC players
1994 African Cup of Nations players
CS Sfaxien players
Espérance Sportive de Tunis players
Association football midfielders
UAE Pro League players